Chinese Badminton Association is a national non-governmental, non-profit sports organisation in China. It represents China in the Badminton World Federation (BWF) and the Badminton Asia Confederation (BAC) as well as the sport of badminton in the All-China Sports Federation.

History
The precursor of Chinese Badminton Association was the Guangzhou Badminton Association, which was established as acting association to host the visiting Indonesian badminton team. Later in September 1958, the Chinese Badminton Association was formally created in Wuhan with Liang Guangfu as its first president.

Tournaments
 China Open, an annual open tournament that attracts the world's elite players.
 China Masters, annual open tournament started in 2005.
 Lingshui China Masters, an open tournament held in Lingshui, Hainan.
 Chinese National Badminton Championships
 China Badminton Super League

References

External links 
  CBA official website

badminton
National members of the Badminton World Federation
Organizations based in Beijing
Sports organizations established in 1958
1958 establishments in China